Arborfield Cross is a village in the civil parish of Arborfield and Newland in the Borough of Wokingham in the English county of Berkshire.

Location
It is situated at what was a cross-roads but is now a roundabout on the A327 road, 3 miles south-east of Reading, 3 miles west of Wokingham, and half a mile to the east of the smaller village of Arborfield. Recently, both Arborfield and Arborfield Cross have become collectively known as Arborfield, there are no signs marking the boundary of Arborfield Cross.

Amenities
There is a mixture of housing, ranging from beautiful 15th century cottages through to modern housing. The local public house, the Swan, closed its doors in 2019 and is no longer the centre of village community life. The Bull Inn is now a popular restaurant. There is a village store and a garage where drivers can get their cars washed. One Saturday every summer there was, until 2010, a charity gig in the park: Rock in the Rec.

References

External links

Villages in Berkshire
Borough of Wokingham